Lubbockichthys myersi, the dottyback, is a species of fish in the family Pseudochromidae.

Description

Distribution and habitat
Lubbockichthys myersi has only been found in Guam.

Etymology
The dottyback was named in honor of Robert F. Myers, a coral-reef biologist and underwater photographer, who collected the type specimen.

References

Pseudoplesiopinae
Taxa named by Anthony C. Gill
Taxa named by Alasdair James Edwards
Fish described in 2004